Jessica Cohen (born 1973) is a British-Israeli-American literary translator. Her translation of David Grossman's 2014 novel A Horse Walks Into a Bar was awarded the 2017 Man Booker International Prize.

Biography
Cohen was born in Colchester, England to Stanley Cohen and Ruth Kretzmer in 1973.  She moved with her family to Israel at the age of seven and went on to study English literature at the Hebrew University of Jerusalem. After moving to the United States with her husband in 1997, she studied Middle Eastern literature and languages at Indiana University.

Cohen has translated a number of Hebrew language books into English, including those by Nir Baram, David Grossman, Amir Gutfreund, Ronit Matalon, Rutu Modan, Dorit Rabinyan, Tom Segev and Nava Semel. She currently resides in Denver, Colorado.

At the awards ceremony for the 2017 Man Booker International Prize, Cohen announced that she would donate half of her share of the winnings to B’Tselem.

Translations
To the End of the Land, David Grossman (2010)
Falling Out of Time, David Grossman (2014)
A Horse Walks into a Bar, David Grossman (2017)
All the Rivers, Dorit Rabinyan (2017)
At Night's End, Nir Baram (2018)
Dear Zealots: Letters from a Divided Land, Amos Oz (2018)
And the Bride Closed the Door, Ronit Matalon (2019)
Further Up the Path, Daniel Oz (2019)
The Drive, Yair Assulin (2020)
Selected Plays, I, II, III, Hanoch Levin (2020)
Three, Dror Mishani (2020)
More Than I Love My Life, David Grossman (2021)

References

External links

1973 births
Living people
British emigrants to Israel
Israeli Jews
Hebrew–English translators
Hebrew University of Jerusalem alumni
Indiana University Bloomington alumni
Israeli emigrants to the United States
Literary translators
International Booker Prize winners
People from Colchester
People from Denver
People from Jerusalem